Below is a list of current rosters of teams from Basketball League of Serbia.

First League

Čačak 94

Dunav

Dynamic

Kolubara

Metalac

Mladost

Novi Pazar

OKK Beograd

Sloboda

Sloga

Spartak

Tamiš

Vojvodina

Vršac

Zdravlje

Zlatibor

Super League

Borac Čačak

Crvena zvezda mts

FMP

Mega Basket

Partizan NIS

Notes

See also 
 List of current ABA Liga team rosters
 List of foreign basketball players in Serbia

Rosters
Lists of basketball players in Serbia